Metal-organic compounds (jargon: metalorganics, metallo-organics) are a class of chemical compounds that contain metals and organic ligands, which confer solubility in organic solvents or volatility.  Compounds with these properties find applications in materials science for metal organic vapor deposition (MOCVD) or sol-gel processing. The distinct term "metal organic compound" refers to metal-containing compounds lacking direct metal-carbon bonds but which contain organic ligands. Metal β-diketonates, alkoxides, dialkylamides, and metal phosphine complexes are representative members of this class. Precise definitions may vary, however the term may describe:
Organometallic chemistry
 Metal coordination complexes of organic ligands, e.g., metal acetylacetonates, alkoxides.